Bukachivtsi is an urban-type settlement in Ivano-Frankivsk Raion of Ivano-Frankivsk Oblast in Ukraine. It hosts the administration of Bukachivtsi settlement hromada, one of the hromadas of Ukraine. Population: .

History
The village had an important Jewish community which was destroyed during World War II.

Until 18 July 2020, Bukachivtsi belonged to Rohatyn Raion. The raion was abolished in July 2020 as part of the administrative reform of Ukraine, which reduced the number of raions of Ivano-Frankivsk Oblast to six. The area of Rohatyn Raion was merged into Ivano-Frankivsk Raion.

References

External links
Bukachevtsy, Ukraine
Bukachevtsy ShtetLinks site on JewishGen - Bukachevtsy, Ukraine

Urban-type settlements in Ivano-Frankivsk Raion
Shtetls
Holocaust locations in Ukraine